Keith Kempenich (born July 28, 1958) is an American politician. He is a member of the North Dakota House of Representatives from the 39th District, serving since 1992. He is a member of the Republican party.

Legislation 

In January 2017, Kempenich proposed a bill titled HB No. 1203 which would prevent a driver who unintentionally injures or kills a person intentionally obstructing a roadway from being held liable for any damages. He said the bill was in response to the Dakota Access Pipeline protests blocking a nearby highway. It was cosponsored by other state representatives and senators, and drew criticism on the grounds that it would violate the First Amendment rights of protestors. Opponents said it would effectively legalize running over protesters on the road, as long as criminal intent cannot be demonstrated on the part of the driver. The bill was defeated by a 50–41 vote on February 13.

References

Living people
1959 births
People from Bowman County, North Dakota
Republican Party members of the North Dakota House of Representatives
21st-century American politicians